Old Erowal Bay is a locality in the City of Shoalhaven in New South Wales, Australia. It lies southwest of Vincentia, which is on Jervis Bay, on the northern shore of St Georges Basin.

References

City of Shoalhaven